Illinois Route 13 (IL 13) is a major east–west state route in southern Illinois. Illinois 13 has its western terminus at Centreville at Illinois Route 157 and its eastern terminus at the Kentucky state line and the Ohio River, at Kentucky Route 56.

Route description

Centreville to Carbondale 
Illinois 13 runs southeast from the St. Louis, Missouri area to Carbondale. It is the main highway between these two cities. Starting in Centreville, IL 13 begins at the IL 157/IL 163 junction. Immediately, IL 13 travels southeast along IL 157. At the next junction, IL 157 branches off northeast. At this point, IL 13 largely parallels the IL 15 expressway. In Belleville, IL 13 meets IL 15 at an incomplete parclo. Continuing southeast, IL 13 largely serves Belleville's business district, unlike the expressway. It then meets IL 15 again and IL 158 at a dumbbell interchange. After that, IL 13 runs concurrently with IL 158. They then intersect IL 159 above Richland Creek. They soon separated from each other. IL 13 turns southeast to connect and then run concurrently with IL 15.

Both routes then turn south towards Freeburg along a four-lane divided highway. At the village limit of Freeburg, the road downgrades into a four-lane undivided highway. Then, the road downgrades into a three-lane roadway in the village. IL 15 then breaks away eastward from IL 13. IL 13 continues southward towards New Athens. Just west of New Athens, as IL 13 curves southeastward, it intersects IL 156. After that, it crosses a bridge over the Kaskaskia River. It then passes through Lenzburg, Marissa (where IL 4 starts to follow along IL 13), Whiteoak, Tilden (where IL 13 branches eastward away from IL 4), Coulterville (where IL 153 briefly runs concurrently with IL 13), Swanwick, Winkle, and Pinckneyville.

In Pinckneyville, IL 13 turns east along IL 154. At the Perry County Courthouse and the Perry County Jail, IL 13 turns south, leaving IL 154 and joining IL 127. Both IL 13 and IL 127 then pass through the Pyramid State Recreation Area, Pyatts (where they intersect IL 152), and Vergennes. Then, IL 4 intersects IL 13 once again. In Murphysboro, IL 149 joins the concurrency. Continuing south, IL 13 turns eastward, leaving the concurrency. At this point, IL 13 skirts the northern edge of the Shawnee Hills and the Shawnee National Forest. It then crosses the Big Muddy River as a four-lane divided highway. Near downtown Carbondale, the road then becomes a six-lane divided highway, then undivided, and then a seven-lane undivided highway. The route then splits into a one-way pair (westbound traffic serves Main Street; eastbound traffic serves Walnut Street). It then intersects US 51 as another one-way pair.

Carbondale to Kentucky state line 

After passing through Carbondale, IL 13 then proceeds to pass through Carterville, Crainville, and Herrin. It then intersects IL 148 southwest of the Veterans Airport of Southern Illinois. In Marion, it then meets I-57 at a SPUI and then IL 37 at a signalized intersection. Beyond that, IL 13 intersects IL 166 in between Marion and Crab Orchard. It then proceeds eastward towards Harrisburg. In Harrisburg, IL 34 runs concurrently with IL 13 before intersecting with US 45. At that point, IL 34 turns south along US 45. Near Equality, IL 13 intersects IL 142. In between Equality and Junction, it then intersects IL 1. Then, the route continues eastward through Shawneetown and then Old Shawneetown before crossing the Shawneetown Bridge over the Ohio River. At that point, IL 13 becomes KY 56.

History 
The state of Illinois was founded in 1818.  One of its first governmental tasks was the construction of primitive dirt roads between the three pioneer villages of Cahokia, Kaskaskia, and Shawneetown.  Illinois Route 13 is a distant descendant of most of the Cahokia-Shawneetown route and has a claim to be one of the oldest state highways in Illinois. 

Illinois Route 13 did not take its current physical form, though, until after the enactment of the Good Roads Movement paving program in 1918.  The statewide plan standardized the alignment of this road and numbered it Illinois 13. 

Except for a few alignment changes, Illinois 13 has remained the same since its inception in 1918. In 1937 it was rerouted around Sparta (now Illinois Route 4 and Illinois Route 154), replacing a large chunk of Illinois Route 152 in the process.

Another reroute took place between 1944 and 1947 when Illinois 13 took over a new highway (then called U.S. Route 460) in and around Belleville. The old route became Alternate Illinois 13. In 1947 it was moved back to Bond Avenue. Later, U.S. 460 would be dropped and replaced with Illinois Route 15.

Harrisburg Bypass
To address congestion in downtown Harrisburg, the Illinois Department of Transportation undertook a project to build the Bill Franks Bypass, a new four-lane road to reroute IL 13 around the city center. The bypass was named in 2011 after a prominent local businessman and philanthropist. In October 2010, the first section of the bypass opened on the north side of Harrisburg, between Illinois Route 34 and U.S. 45, and IL 34 was rerouted on this portion of the bypass. The remaining section of the bypass west of IL 34, replacing IL 13's former route along busy Poplar Street, opened in April 2012.

Major intersections

References

External links

 Illinois Highway Ends: Illinois Route 13

013
Transportation in St. Clair County, Illinois
Transportation in Washington County, Illinois
Transportation in Randolph County, Illinois
Transportation in Perry County, Illinois
Transportation in Jackson County, Illinois
Transportation in Williamson County, Illinois
Transportation in Saline County, Illinois
Transportation in Gallatin County, Illinois